Lysiphragma howesii is a species of moth in the family Tineidae. It was described by Ambrose Quail in 1901. This species is endemic to New Zealand.

References

External links
Image of type specimen of Lysiphragma howesii
Citizen science images of moth

Moths described in 1901
Tineidae
Moths of New Zealand
Endemic fauna of New Zealand
Endemic moths of New Zealand